The 1984–85 NBA season was the Hawks' 36th season in the NBA and 17th season in Atlanta.

Draft picks

Roster

Regular season
The Hawks played 12 of their 41 home games at New Orleans' Lakefront Arena.

Season standings

z - clinched division title
y - clinched division title
x - clinched playoff spot

Record vs. opponents

Game log

|- align="center" bgcolor="#ffcccc"
| 2
| October 27, 1984
| Philadelphia
| L 108–111
|
|
|
| The Omni
| 1–1

|- align="center" bgcolor="#ffcccc"
| 4
| November 1, 1984
| Detroit
|- align="center" bgcolor="#ffcccc"
| 6
| November 7, 1984
| @ Milwaukee
|- align="center" bgcolor="#ffcccc"
| 9
| November 13, 1984
| Milwaukee
|- align="center" bgcolor="#ccffcc"
| 12
| November 21, 1984
| Utah
|- align="center" bgcolor="#ccffcc"
| 16
| November 28, 1984
| Milwaukee

|- align="center" bgcolor="#ffcccc"
| 21
| December 9, 1984
| @ Boston
| L 127–128
|
|
|
| Boston Garden
| 8–13
|- align="center" bgcolor="#ffcccc"
| 25
| December 15, 1984
| Boston
| L 94–101
|
|
|
| The Omni
| 10–15
|- align="center" bgcolor="#ffcccc"
| 26
| December 18, 19847:30p.m. EST
| L.A. Lakers
| L 116–117
| Rivers (25)
| Levingston (10)
| Johnson (17)
| The Omni9,844
| 10–16

|- align="center" bgcolor="#ffcccc"
| 34
| January 4, 1985
| @ Detroit
|- align="center" bgcolor="#ffcccc"
| 37
| January 12, 1985
| Boston
| L 111–119
|
|
|
| The Omni
| 15–22
|- align="center" bgcolor="#ffcccc"
| 39
| January 16, 1985
| @ Philadelphia
| L 99–122
|
|
|
| The Spectrum
| 16–23
|- align="center" bgcolor="#ffcccc"
| 42
| January 22, 1985
| Detroit

|- align="center" bgcolor="#ffcccc"
| 47
| February 2, 1985
| @ Detroit
|- align="center" bgcolor="#ffcccc"
| 48
| February 4, 1985
| @ Philadelphia
| L 92–106
|
|
|
| The Spectrum
| 20–28
|- align="center" bgcolor="#ccffcc"
| 50
| February 7, 1985
| @ Milwaukee
|- align="center"
|colspan="9" bgcolor="#bbcaff"|All-Star Break
|- style="background:#cfc;"
|- bgcolor="#bbffbb"
|- align="center" bgcolor="#ffcccc"
| 51
| February 12, 1985
| @ Denver
| L 107–131
|
|
|
| McNichols Sports Arena
| 21–30
|- align="center" bgcolor="#ccffcc"
| 52
| February 13, 1985
| @ Utah
|- align="center" bgcolor="#ffcccc"
| 53
| February 15, 198510:30p.m. EST
| @ L.A. Lakers
| L 111–120
| Johnson (29)
| Levingston, Wilkins (9)
| Johnson (13)
| The Forum13,852
| 22–31
|- align="center" bgcolor="#ffcccc"
| 57
| February 26, 1985
| Denver
| L 94–106
|
|
|
| The Omni
| 24–33

|- align="center" bgcolor="#ccffcc"
| 59
| March 1, 1985
| @ Boston
| W 114–105
|
|
|
| Boston Garden
| 25–34
|- align="center" bgcolor="#ffcccc"
| 61
| March 5, 1985
| Portland
|- align="center" bgcolor="#ffcccc"
| 62
| March 6, 1985
| @ Philadelphia
| L 86–96
|
|
|
| The Spectrum
| 25–37
|- align="center" bgcolor="#ffcccc"
| 63
| March 9, 1985
| Detroit
|- align="center" bgcolor="#ffcccc"
| 64
| March 11, 1985
| Milwaukee
|- align="center" bgcolor="#ffcccc"
| 65
| March 12, 1985
| Boston
| L 115–126
|
|
|
| Lakefront Arena
| 25–40
|- align="center" bgcolor="#ffcccc"
| 68
| March 17, 1985
| @ Portland
|- align="center" bgcolor="#ffcccc"
| 74
| March 30, 1985
| @ Milwaukee

|- align="center" bgcolor="#ccffcc"
| 75
| April 1, 1985
| @ Detroit
|- align="center" bgcolor="#ffcccc"
| 76
| April 2, 1985
| Philadelphia
| L 91–102
|
|
|
| The Omni
| 30–46

Player statistics

Player Statistics Citation:

Awards and records

Transactions

References

See also
1984-85 NBA season

Atlanta Hawks seasons
Ata
Atlanta Haw
Atlanta Haw